Gibson Clark (December 5, 1844 – December 14, 1914) was an American jurist who served as a justice of the Wyoming Supreme Court from January 2, 1893 to September 22, 1894. He would resign that position in order to become the first official US Attorney for the District of Wyoming. He was born in Clarke County, Virginia and served in the Confederate Army during the American Civil War.

Early life
Gibson Clark was born in Millwood, Virginia, in December 1844 to James Hopkins Clark
and Jane Adelaide Gregory Clark. He was educated in public schools and at the beginning of the Civil War he enlisted in the Confederate army, serving with the Parker battery until the final surrender of Appomattox. He fought in some of the bloodiest battles of the war, including Chickamauga, Spottsylvania, Cold Harbor, Gettysburg and Petersburg. At the end of the war he returned to Virginia but in 1866 moved to St. Louis, Missouri, where he was employed as a clerk in a mercantile establishment. Later that same year he went to Fort Laramie, Wyoming, then in the territory of Dakota, arriving there from Nebraska City. There he was employed as a clerk and bookkeeper in the post trader's store. He was elected to the Territorial Legislative Assembly in 1871. From 1872 to 1883 he worked in mining in Nevada and Utah.

Career in law and as a judge
He read law while living on his earnings as a clerk and in 1880 was admitted to the Utah bar, but did not begin practice until 1883, when he moved to Fort Collins, Colorado and opened an office. He remained there until 1886 and then moved to Cheyenne, Wyoming, quickly building up a lucrative practice here. In November 1892, he was elected to the Wyoming Supreme Court. He resigned on September 22, 1894 to accept an appointment as the first U.S. Attorney for the district of Wyoming. After his term expired in 1898, he resumed his legal practice with his son, John D. Clark, with the firm of Clark & Clark. He also served as a trustee for the Cheyenne School District and University of Wyoming.

Family

In 1881, he was married to Frances A. Johnson of Iowa, who had four sons with him.
John D. Clark was one of Cheyenne's lawyers, having been engaged in the practice with his father for several years and continued it after his father's death. Hopkins Clark was a civil engineer and lived in Los Angeles, California. Frank Clark resided in Cheyenne and identified with the Federal Land company. Not much is known about Rober Clark except he was a student in Cheyenne.

Death
Judge Gibson Clark died at 1:30 in the morning at his residence at No. 321 East Seventeenth Street. At his bedside when the end came were his wife and four sons. The end had been anticipated for nearly a fortnight. The funeral was held at St. Mark's Episcopal Church.

Miscellaneous
Clark died on December 14, 1914 in Cheyenne. An elementary school in Cheyenne was named for him in 1920 and torn down in 2009.

As a citizen he had high ideals and sought to impress them upon the community. A veteran of the Confederate army, he became a most loyal and enthusiastic supporter of the united country. An address which he delivered at a G.A.R. meeting some years ago was considered one of the finest pieces of patriotic sentiment ever delivered in the state.

References

Justices of the Wyoming Supreme Court
1844 births
1914 deaths
19th-century American businesspeople
19th-century American lawyers
19th-century American judges
20th-century American lawyers
American mining businesspeople
Confederate States Army soldiers
Members of the Wyoming Territorial Legislature
People from Clarke County, Virginia
People from St. Louis
People from Cheyenne, Wyoming
People from Fort Collins, Colorado
People of Virginia in the American Civil War
United States Attorneys for the District of Wyoming